The men's 100 metre butterfly event at the 11th FINA World Swimming Championships (25m) took place 12 – 13 December 2012 at the Sinan Erdem Dome.

Records
Prior to this competition, the existing world and championship records were as follows.

The following records were established during the competition:

Results

Heats

Semifinals

Swim-off

Final

The final was held at 20:33.

References

External links
 2012 FINA World Swimming Championships (25 m): Men's 100 metre butterfly entry list, from OmegaTiming.com.

Butterfly 100 metre, men's
World Short Course Swimming Championships